Carbonate County was a county of the state of Colorado that existed for only two days in 1879.  Carbonate County was created by renaming Lake County, Colorado.

History
On 8 February 1879, the Colorado General Assembly renamed Lake County as Carbonate County.  Two days later on 10 February 1879, the Colorado General Assembly split Carbonate County into the new Chaffee County and the renamed Lake County.

See also

Outline of Colorado
Index of Colorado-related articles
Historic Colorado counties
Chaffee County, Colorado
Lake County, Colorado

References

External links

1879 in the United States
Former counties of Colorado
Chaffee County, Colorado
Lake County, Colorado
1879 in Colorado